The 2011–12 Croatian Ice Hockey League season was the 21st season of the Croatian Ice Hockey League, the top level of ice hockey in Croatia. Four teams participated in the league, and KHL Medveščak Zagreb won the championship.

Regular season

Playoffs

Semifinals
 KHL Mladost Zagreb – INA Sisak 2:0 (23:2, 15:2)
 KHL Medveščak Zagreb – KHL Zagreb 2:0 (5:2, 12:3)

Final 
  KHL Mladost – KHL Medveščak 1:3 (8:5, 3:7, 3:10, 3:6)

External links
 Official website
 

Croat
Croatian Ice Hockey League seasons
1